The South Fork Musselshell River is a tributary of the Musselshell River in south central Montana in the United States.

It rises in the Lewis and Clark National Forest in the Crazy Mountains in southern Meagher County. It flows northeast, joining the North Fork to form the Musselshell near Martinsdale just west of county line with Wheatland County.

See also

List of rivers of Montana
Montana Stream Access Law

Rivers of Montana
Rivers of Meagher County, Montana